Ji-In Cho (born 30 December 1976) is a German heavy metal singer of Korean descent. She has been the lead vocalist and pianist of the symphonic metal band Krypteria since December 2004 until their hiatus after her pregnancy. Following this, she became the lead vocalist of And Then She Came, a band consisting of most of the former members of Krypteria.

Biography
Ji-In Cho began an extensive musical education, including piano lessons, when she was six years old. Later she studied Music (Cologne music academy) and Theology (University of Cologne).

In 2003, Cho was unwittingly registered by a friend to the German edition of the Fame Academy television show for musical talents. For the show she recorded a cover version of Alanis Morissette's song "Ironic" which brought her into the German singles charts. In the end she became a member of the band Become One that was formed by successful contestants of the show.

Since December 2004, Cho has been the lead singer of the band Krypteria, whose single "Liberatio" was used for a charity campaign in aid of the tsunami victims in Southeast Asia. The outcome was proceeds of Euro 11 Million by selling 150,000 singles. "Liberatio" reached the status of a golden record and had the chart position No.3 for many weeks.

In 2012, Cho and Krypteria celebrated the birth of her first child, and took a break from live shows.

In 2016, Cho and most of the former Krypteria members formed a new band called And Then She Came.

Discography

Solo 
 "Ironic" (2003), single, Sony/BMG, peaked at #31 in the German charts.

With Become One

Studio albums

Singles

With Krypteria

Studio albums 

 denotes an unofficial release

EP 
Evolution Principle (2006), Synergy Records

Singles 

 denotes an unofficial release

With And Then She Came

Studio albums

2016 
And Then She Came
Bonsoir At The Abattoir (live)
Live MMXVI (DVD)

2018 
Kaosystematiq

With Corvus Corax

Studio albums

2017 
Der Fluch des Drachen

References

External links 
 

1976 births
Living people
Women heavy metal singers
German heavy metal singers
German people of Korean descent
21st-century German women singers